Research Integrity and Peer Review is an international, open access, peer reviewed journal that was launched in 2016. It is published by BioMed Central and focuses on problems in peer review, replication, and the scientific process.

See also 
 Metascience

References 

Peer review
English-language journals
Open access journals
Publications established in 2016
BioMed Central academic journals